Alpine Antics may refer to:
 Alpine Antics (1929 film), an animated cartoon featuring Oswald the Lucky Rabbit
 Alpine Antics (1936 film), a Looney Tunes animated cartoon